Juni Karimah binti Noor Jamali (born 31 October 2002) is a Malaysian sailor. She competed in the women's 470 event at the 2020 Summer Olympics.

References

External links
 
 

2002 births
Living people
Malaysian female sailors (sport)
Olympic sailors of Malaysia
Sailors at the 2020 Summer Olympics – 470
Place of birth missing (living people)
People from Kedah